Roberto Payán is a town and municipality in the Nariño Department, Colombia. The municipal seat is known as San José de las Lagunas.

References

Municipalities of Nariño Department